The Embassy of the State of Israel in Moscow is the chief diplomatic mission of Israel in Russia. It is located at 56 Bolshaya Ordynka Street in the Yakimanka District of Moscow.

See also 
 Israel–Russia relations
 Diplomatic missions in Russia

References

External links 
  Embassy of Israel in Moscow

Israel–Russia relations
Israel
Moscow
1991 establishments in Russia
Israel–Soviet Union relations